Jong is a district in the municipality of Bærum, Norway. Mainly a residential area, the population in 2007 was 4,778.

This residential area is located west of the city Sandvika, on top of the hill Jongsåsen.

The district has a primary school, Jong skole. The traffic is low compared to other local residential areas.

References

Villages in Akershus
Bærum